Unic is a former French car manufacturer.

Unic, UNIC, or UNICS may also refer to:
 UNIC Project, a project supported by the European Commission
 UNICS Kazan, a professional basketball club in Russia
 United Nations Information Centres
 University of Nicosia
 Unic, a manufacturer of espresso machines owned by Electrolux Professional

See also
Uniq
Unix